The name "Underwater Centre" may mean:-

The British Underwater Centre near Dartmouth, Devon (now closed down)
Bovisand Underwater Centre Ltd: was at Fort Bovisand (now closed down)